Bell Creek or Bells Creek may refer to:

Australia 

Bells Creek, Queensland, a locality in the Sunshine Coast Region
Bells Creek (Blacktown, New South Wales), a river in Greater Western Sydney

United States 

Bell Canyon, a creek in Orange County, California
Bell Creek (Gasconade River tributary), a stream in Missouri
Bell Creek (Elkhorn River), a river in Nebraska
Belle Creek, Montana, a city in Montana
Bell Creek (Pine Creek), in Luzerne County, Pennsylvania
Bell Creek (Southern California), a tributary of the Los Angeles River in Los Angeles, California
Bell Creek Township, Burt County, Nebraska, a township in Nebraska
Bell Creek (Tunkhannock Creek), in Susquehanna County, Pennsylvania
Bells Creek (West Virginia)

See also 
 Bell (disambiguation)
 Belle Creek (disambiguation)